Manoj Narayanan is an Indian theatre artist, and director, from Villiappally. He was the first director to win the Kerala Sangeetha Nataka Akademi award five times in a row. His famous award-winning works are Ntuppuppakkoranendarnnu based on the same title of the proclaimed novel of the famous writer Vaikkom Mohammed Basheer, Kadathanadan Pennu Thumbolarch, Kadathanattamma, Kuriyedath Thathri, Thacholi Othenan, Perunthachan, Nishkalankan, Nellu, and Vartgamanathilekkoru Kannaki.

Narayanan is also very passionate about children's theatre and has directed many children's plays.

References 
https://www.thehindu.com/features/friday-review/theatre/On-a-winning-streak/article14011960.ece
https://www.nettv4u.com/celebrity/malayalam/director-of-photography/manoj-narayanan

Indian theatre directors
Living people
Year of birth missing (living people)
Artists from Kozhikode